The Renfrew Rocks are a basketball club based in the town of Renfrew, Scotland. The club was founded in 1989 by Donny Henderson and Robert Taft, with players from the local Renfrew High School, where the club, consisting of several senior and junior teams, is still based.  The senior men's team entered the Scottish National League Division 2 for the 2021–22 season, winning the league with an unbeaten record and reaching the semi-finals of the Scottish Cup.  Following their undefeated season, the club gained a historic promotion to the Scottish Basketball top flight for the 2022-23 season. The club have a close partnership with the University of the West of Scotland, who compete in the British Universities and Colleges Sport Scottish Tier 1 League.

Honours
Scottish National League Division 2 (1): 2021-22
Strathclyde League Basketball Association (3): 2016-17, 2018-19, 2021-22
Anderson Cup (2): 2017-18, 2018-19
Executive Cup (2): 2015-16, 2016-17      

Junior Titles

Strathclyde League Basketball Association (1): 2014-15

SLBA Cup (2): 2017-18, 2018-19

Season-by-season records

Roster

References 

Basketball teams in Scotland
1989 in Scotland
Sport in Scotland